The National Diving and Activity Centre (NDAC) was a facility located at a large flooded quarry at Tidenham, Gloucestershire, England, near to the border with Wales at Chepstow. It was previously Dayhouse Quarry, a source of limestone, which was flooded in 1996. The diving centre opened in 2003, and closed in 2022.

Facilities
PADI and IANTD training was provided on site, and many local BSAC and SAA clubs used the site for training. All freediving at the NDAC was undertaken through SaltFree Divers.

Closure
On 18 February 2022, the NDAC issued a statement via social media saying that the site was permanently closed. The following month it was reported that the site had been purchased by a company seeking to develop equipment to enable people to live deep under water.

In media
In 2017, the NDAC was a location for the Netflix folk horror film Apostle starring Michael Sheen and Dan Stevens.

References

External links

Diving quarries in the United Kingdom
Forest of Dean
Lakes of Gloucestershire
Tourist attractions in Gloucestershire
Underwater diving sites in the United Kingdom
Underwater diving training organizations